The Italian record progression men's javelin throw is recognised by the Italian Athletics Federation (FIDAL).

Record progression

See also
 List of Italian records in athletics
 Men's javelin throw world record progression

References

javelin throw M